Emeka Offor (born February 10, 1959) is a Nigerian oil magnate, philanthropist and entrepreneur. He is the former chairman of  Erhc Energy Inc, the CEO of Chrome Group, one of the leading West African oil and gas conglomerate, and the founder of the Sir Emeka Offor Foundation.

Background 
Offor hails from Irefi Oraifite in Ekwusigo Local Government area of Anambra State, Nigeria. Offor had his primary education at Eziukwu Primary School in Aba, Abia State, and St. Michael's Primary School at Ogbete, Enugu. On completing his primary education, he began his secondary education at Merchant of Light School, and subsequently moved to Abbot Boys High School, Ihiala, Anambra State. He is a Knight of Saint Christopher in the Church of Nigeria, and one of the premier Knights in Oraifite, Anambra State.

Philanthropy 
He created the Sir Emeka Offor Foundation (SEOF) "to help people in need to become independent and self-sufficient".

References

Living people
Nigerian businesspeople
Nigerian businesspeople in the oil industry
1959 births
Igbo people
People from Anambra State